In bacteriology, a taxon in disguise is a species, genus or higher unit of biological classification whose evolutionary history reveals has evolved from another unit of a similar or lower rank, making the parent unit paraphyletic. That happens when rapid evolution makes a new species appear so radically different from the ancestral group that it is not (initially) recognised as belonging to the parent phylogenetic group, which is left as an evolutionary grade.

While the term is from bacteriology, parallel examples are found throughout the tree of life. For example, four-footed animals have evolved from piscine ancestors but since they are not generally considered fish, they can be said to be "fish in disguise".

In many cases, the paraphyly can be resolved by reclassifying the taxon in question under the parent group. However, in bacteriology, since renaming groups may have serious consequences since by causing confusion over the identity of pathogens, it is generally avoided for some groups.

Examples

Shigella 

The bacterial genus Shigella is the cause of bacillary dysentery, a potentially-severe infection that kills over a million people every year. The genus (S. dysenteriae, S. flexneri, S. boydii, S. sonnei) have evolved from the common intestinal bacterium Escherichia coli, which renders that species paraphyletic. E. coli itself can also cause serious dysentery, but differences in genetic makeup between E. coli and Shigella cause different medical conditions and symptoms.

Escherichia coli is a badly-classified species since some strains share only 20% of their genome. It is so diverse that it should be given a higher taxonomic ranking. However, medical conditions associated with E. coli itself and Shigella make the current classification not to be changed to avoid confusion in medical context. Shigella will thus remain "E. coli in disguise".

B. cereus-group 

Similarly, the Bacillus species of the B. cereus-group (B. anthracis, B. cereus, B . thuringiensis, B. mycoides, B. pseudomycoides, B. weihenstephanensis and B. medusa) have 99-100% similar 16S rRNA sequence (97% is a commonly-cited adequate species limit) and should be considered a single species. Some members of the group appear to have arisen from other Bacillus strains by acquiring a protein coding plasmid and so the group may thus be polyphyletic. For medical reasons, such as anthrax, the current arrangement of separate species has remained intact.

Large genera of microbes
 The bacterial genus Pseudomonas has enlarged through several generations of taxonomic methods, bringing the species count to alarming proportions, with around 800 species recognized by the mid-20th century. The nitrogen-fixing bacteria of the genus Azotobacter and the species Azomonas macrocytogenes have evolved from a species in the genus Pseudomonas. Its nitrogen-fixing capabilities and deviant features have caused Azotobacter to be described as "Pseudomonas in disguise".
 The genus Bacillus was described early in the history of microbiology and so is a large genus that is very genetically diverse, 266 species. The genera Paenibacillus and Brevibacillus are clades that are nested within Bacillus. Since Bacillus is highly medically relevant and Paenibacillus is a model organism that is used in research, renaming them to reflect phylogeny would result in confusion.

See also 
 Monophyly
 Paraphyly
 Polyphyly
 Species problem
 Evolutionary grade
 Cryptic species complex
 Synonym (taxonomy)
 Taxonomy
 LPSN, a list of accepted bacterial and archaeal names
 Bacterial phyla, a complex classification scheme
 Cyanobacteria, a phylum of common bacteria that remain poorly classified

References 

Biological classification
Bacteriology
Evolutionary biology